Yo Si Me Enamoré is the debut studio album by American salsa recording artist Huey Dunbar. Released on February 27, 2001 through Sony Discos. The album was produced by Omar Alfanno and co-produced by Alejandro Jaén, Sergio George and Kike Santander and contains 11 songs and 4 singles in bolero, salsa and Latin pop versions.

It includes a duet with the Mexican actress and singer Lucero in the song "Lo Siento" in its Balada version. The first single "Yo Si Me Enamoré" in its bolero version was nominated for a Latin Grammy for Best Tropical Song at the 2th Annual Latin Grammy Awards on October 30, 2001.

Background 
Following Dunbar's departure from the American salsa band Dark Latin Groove following their third studio album Gotcha! released in 1999 Sergio George proposed to him after a few months to start recording his debut album.

Critical reception 
Evan C. Gutiérrez of AllMusic said, "Together with some other New York talent, the two formed the genre-crossing tropical group DLG, and in a matter of a few short years, cranked out three fantastic albums that went a long way towards turning Dunbar into salsa's up and coming bad boy. For Dunbar, going solo was a natural next step."

Track listing

Especial bonus track

Sales and certifications

References 

2001 debut albums
2001 albums
Sony Discos albums
Albums produced by Kike Santander
Huey Dunbar albums
Albums produced by Sergio George